Ka-Blog! is a Philippine television informative show broadcast by GMA Network. Hosted by Andrea Torres, Mico Aytona and Monica Verallo, it premiered on August 9, 2008. The show concluded on October 2, 2010.

Overview
Each week, Ka-blog! will serve as the tambayan for teens to get a load of the latest updates, trends, and information on the many issues relevant to them—from fierce fashion forecasts to mind-blowing tech toys, the hippest hangouts and the hottest heartthrobs, as well as more pressing problems that concern teens, such as relationship and peer issues.

Hosts
 Andrea Torres
 Mico Aytona
 Monica Verallo
 Lucky Mercado

Accolades

References

External links
 

2008 Philippine television series debuts
2010 Philippine television series endings
Filipino-language television shows
GMA Network original programming
GMA Integrated News and Public Affairs shows
Philippine television shows